Clionella subventricosa is a species of sea snail, a marine gastropod mollusc in the family Clavatulidae.

Subspecies
 Clionella subventricosa kaffraria Kilburn, 1985 (Eastern Cape subspecies)
 Clionella subventricosa subventricosa (E. A. Smith, 1877)

Description
The shell grows to a length of 22 mm.

The ovate, rather dark brown shell has a squat, fusiform shape. The eight whorls are slightly convex. The spiral sculpture shows shallow, well-spaced grooves. The axial ribs are rounded and number 11-14 per whorl. The shoulder angle lies below the middle of the whorl. The periphery is flattened so that body whorl is weakly biangulate. The aperture is rather large with a rather narrow, slightly notched siphonal canal. The color inside the aperture shows various shades of pale brown. The anal sinus is very shallow.

Distribution
This marine species occurs from False Bay to Cape Agulhas, South Africa

References

 Kilburn, R.N. (1985). Turridae (Mollusca: Gastropoda) of southern Africa and Mozambique. Part 2. Subfamily Clavatulinae. Annals of the Natal Museum 26(2), 417–470
 Steyn, D.G. & Lussi, M. (1998) Marine Shells of South Africa. An Illustrated Collector's Guide to Beached Shells. Ekogilde Publishers, Hartebeespoort, South Africa, ii + 264 pp. page(s): 150

External links

 

Endemic fauna of South Africa
subventricosa
Gastropods described in 1877